Pauline Donalda,  (March 5, 1882 – October 22, 1970) was a Canadian operatic soprano.

Early life and education
Donalda was born Pauline Lightstone in Montreal, Quebec, the daughter of Jewish parents who changed their surname from Lichtenstein to Lightstone after immigrating from Russia and Poland. She studied with Clara Lichtenstein (no relation) at Royal Victoria College, part of McGill University. In 1902, went to the Conservatoire de Paris on a grant from Donald Smith, Lord Strathcona, the patron of RVC.  There, she studied voice with Edmond Duvernoy.  She adopted the stage name Donalda in honour of her patron.

Career
With the help of composer Jules Massenet, Donalda made her debut in 1904 in Nice, singing the title role in his opera Manon.  The following year, she debuted in London, singing the role of Micaëla in Geoges Bizet's Carmen. Donalda was the first to sing the roles of Concepción in Maurice Ravel's L'heure espagnole and Ah-joe in Franco Leoni's L'Oracolo at Covent Garden. In November 1906, she returned to Montreal to sing in a recital at the Montreal Arena with her new husband, baritone Paul Seveilhac. The following month, she began a season with Oscar Hammerstein's new Manhattan Opera House. She returned to Europe in 1907, singing principally in London and Paris.

Donalda was in Canada when World War I broke out. She chose to remain in the country, singing in concerts and music halls, with occasional appearances in New York and Boston. In Montreal, she organized the Donalda Sunday Afternoon Concerts, donating the proceeds to war charities.  She returned to Paris in 1917, and married her second husband, Mischa Léon, there the following year.

In 1922, Donalda opened a teaching studio in Paris where she taught many students over the next few years. She moved back to Montreal in 1937 and opened a studio there. Her students in Montreal included Robert Savoie. She founded the Opera Guild of Montreal in 1942, serving as president and artistic director until 1969.

In 1967, she was made an Officer of the Order of Canada "for her contribution to the arts, especially opera, as a singer and founder of the Opera Guild in Montreal."

References

External links
 The Virtual Gramophone's Pauline Lightstone Donalda biography
 portrait

1882 births
1970 deaths
Canadian operatic sopranos
Jewish Canadian musicians
Singers from Montreal
Officers of the Order of Canada
20th-century Canadian women opera singers
Conservatoire de Paris alumni